Naveed Amjid Sattar  is a Scottish medical researcher and Professor of Metabolic Medicine at the Institute of Cardiovascular & Medical Sciences at the University of Glasgow, as well as an Honorary Consultant in Metabolic Medicine at the Glasgow Royal Infirmary. He was described by the BBC as "a leading expert in diabetes and cardio-vascular disease research". He has been an ISI Highly Cited Researcher since 2014. In 2016, he was elected a fellow of the Academy of Medical Sciences. He is also a Fellow of the Royal College of Pathologists, the Royal College of Physicians and Surgeons of Glasgow, and the Royal Society of Edinburgh.

References

External links
Faculty page

Living people
Academics of the University of Glasgow
Alumni of the University of Glasgow
Scottish medical researchers
Cardiovascular researchers
Fellows of the Academy of Medical Sciences (United Kingdom)
Fellows of the Royal College of Pathologists
Fellows of the Royal College of Physicians and Surgeons of Glasgow
Fellows of the Royal Society of Edinburgh
Year of birth missing (living people)